Nick Allen Brown (born February 5, 1978) is an American author and speaker best known for his fiction books centred around small towns. His first novel, Field of Dead Horses, was published in May 2012 by Harrowood Books. After receiving critical acclaim coupled with exceptional sales, Harrowood Books signed Nick Allen Brown to an indefinite contract.

Early life 
Brown was raised by a single mother who encouraged his interests in both literature and film. From a very early age, Brown was exposed to the works of film directors such as David Lean, Brian De Palma, Sergio Leone, Francis Ford Coppola, Ridley Scott, Steven Spielberg, Jim Henson, Alan J. Pakula, and Martin Scorsese. In addition to film, Brown was raised on literature, choosing to focus on the works of Michael Crichton, Ernest Hemingway, John Irving and Alan Dean Foster.

Career

Writing career 

Brown began his career by writing query letters to more than 300 publishers and literary agents. After receiving more than 200 rejection letters, Brown continued to the pursuit to publish his first manuscript, The Perfect Swing, a fiction story set in present day about the first ever amateur Masters Tournament winner. Taking advice he received from those who rejected him in the industry, Brown penned Field of Dead Horses, a mystery set in northern Kentucky in 1939.

In 2014, the second novel by Brown, The Astronaut from Bear Creek was published, selling more than five thousand copies in its first week.

Small town setting 
Brown's novels take place in small, American towns and usually feature a diner or a general store.

Pen name 
In late 2017, it was announced by Harrowood Books that Brown would be writing a string of novels under the pen name, Nicholas H. and will be publishing novels in the horror and sci-fi genre. The pen name was created as to not confuse those who have become familiar with Brown's dramatic, small town stories.

Personal life 
Brown married Rebecca Lynn Tenpenny in Maryville, Tennessee and lives in Nashville, Tennessee where they have two children.

In 2004, he interned for Gary Shusett and Ron Shusett in Los Angeles, California as part of the famous Sherwood Oaks Experimental College founded by Gary Shusett. While interning for Sherwood Oaks Experimental College, Brown received instruction from Gary Goldman (screenwriter), James Cameron, and Quentin Tarantino.

During the fifteen years that Brown was working to become a full-time author, he worked at television station, WBKO and Hughes and Coleman Law Firm.

Awards and honors 
 2013 Reader's Favorite Award for historical fiction - Field of Dead Horses
 2015 Official selection for One Book, One Community of Shelby County, Kentucky

Bibliography 

A complete listing of the works by Nick Allen Brown

Novels 
 Field of Dead Horses (2012)
 The Astronaut from Bear Creek (2014)
 Grainger County Tomatoes (2020)

Published under the name Nicholas H. 
 What Lies Inside (2017)

References

External links 
 
 Television Interview with Nick Allen Brown WKYT (TV Interview)

American thriller writers
American male novelists
21st-century American novelists
1978 births
Living people
21st-century American male writers